Hazel Park is a city in Oakland County in the U.S. state of Michigan.  As a part of Metro Detroit, the city shares its southern border with the city of Detroit.  As of the 2010 census, the population was 16,422.

Hazel Park was incorporated as a city in 1941 and bills itself as The Friendly City.  From 1949 to 2018, it was the site of the Hazel Park Raceway, considered a high-quality facility originally used for both Thoroughbred and Standardbred racing. From 1985 on, the track ran only harness races. After 1996, it also provided simulcasts of races year round from across North America, with betting allowed on these races at the track facilities.

History
This area was long occupied by indigenous peoples, with such historic and current tribes as the Potawatomi and others known to European fur traders and colonists from the 17th century.

In the later 19th century, as westward migration increased from the eastern United States to the Great Lakes territories, this area was settled by European Americans. They first developed it for agriculture. In October 1882, a group of farmers gathered to organize the community's first school. They built a one-room school in 1883 and later expanded it to two rooms. In 1884, John W. Benjamine petitioned the state of Michigan to form a school district from Royal Oak Township. Benjamine, who was School Inspector for Royal Oak Township, named it Hazel Park School District 8, after the abundant hazelnut bushes in the area.

In 1920, the Thomas W. Lacey School, was built on present-day Woodruff Avenue. The first Hazel Park school had been sold to Frank Neusius, who used it as a barber shop and neighborhood grocery.

Given a rapid increase in this period of the number of school-age children as population grew, the school district soon added four grade schools. It built a larger building at the central location, also called the Lacey School. This became the site for high school students. With further postwar population growth, Hazel Park High School was built. The former high school at John R and 9 Mile Roads was used as Lacey Junior High School.

Hazel Park's growth was stimulated by the expansion of jobs at the Ford Motor Company, based in nearby Highland Park. Hospitals, offices and shops were developed in the area of 9 Mile Road. The electric Stephenson Line was a convenient way for commuters to travel by trolley to Highland Park and Detroit. In 1924, Hazel Park installed its first traffic light, was granted a post office, and established a Deputy Sheriff's office. The city was incorporated in 1941.

During the 1930s and 1940s, rallies and community events helped the city during the Great Depression and the years of World War II. Large parts of the auto industry were converted to production of defense-related goods, and thousands of people migrated into the area for new jobs. After the city's incorporation, it improved the infrastructure and provided running water to all areas.

In 1942, the Elias Brothers, John, Fred and Louis Elias, established a diner in Hazel Park. The Dixie Drive-In was one of the first in the Midwest to offer curbside services. In 1952, the diner was franchised as a Big Boy restaurant. Louis Elias was elected as Mayor of Hazel Park, serving two terms from 1953 to 1961. The Elias brothers continued to open Big Boy restaurants throughout the Metro Detroit area and in 1983 purchased the franchiser.

With the return of thousands of soldiers from World War II, housing demand was very high in the area. It stimulated a boom in construction. Many of the current bungalows in the city were built shortly after the war.

Hazel Park Raceway opened for thoroughbred horse racing in 1949. It was considered a state-of-the-art facility. Harness racing was added in 1953. In 1950 the Detroit Race Course opened in Livonia, Michigan, to the north of Detroit, offering competition with both flat and harness racing. In 1996 the state legislature approved onsite betting at racetracks for simulcast events, and the track was opened year round for patrons to view on racing events from across North America. In 2018 the profitable Hazel Park track was closed after being sold. The new owner wanted to use the large property to develop new warehouse space for an Amazon distribution center.

In 1966 the Interstate 75 (I-75) freeway was fully completed through Hazel Park, as part of the postwar highway construction subsidized by the federal government. It superseded Stephenson Highway, now used as a service drive. Similarly, I-696 was constructed through the neighboring city of Madison Heights in 1979; it joins the two freeways and creating a busy junction with I-75, part of which extends into Hazel Park's north end.

Architecture
Hazel Park is dominated by domestic architecture of the post-World War II era. Many of the city's houses were built in the Cape Cod bungalow style, shortly after World War Two, and have a second story encompassed in the home's roofing.

Michigan bungalows are also common in the city. These houses were originally built during the 1920s and 1930s and can often be found near the downtown area.

Ranch houses became a popular style, and were builtin the northern neighborhoods during the late 1950s and early 1960s. Older ranch houses were often built with aluminum siding, whereas newer ones, such as the ones built in the Courts, were built in brick or stone.

Front split-level and side split-level houses are not common in the city. However, back split houses - split-levels with the second story built into the back - are common in the southern portion of the city near the 8 Mile border. This style of home is often the result of additions built onto one-story bungalows and ranch houses.

Colonial houses are more rare in the city, but are scattered throughout different neighborhoods. These houses are often built in brick and usually resemble urban Tudor houses. Some are built in stone, often more common north of 9 Mile Road. Others are built in the Traditional Tudor style.

New development homes are extremely common in the city. They can be seen on many blocks of Hazel Park, and often range from two-story snout houses to detached single-family brownstones. Many of these houses are built in the Neo-eclectic style.

Neighborhoods

Residential areas make up the majority of the city and are in most cases located in sub-divisions located off main roads. Hazel Park was originally laid out in a grid from 1900 to 1925. East-west streets ran from Dequindre Road to Hilton Road on the western edge of the city (now the independent city of Ferndale); and north-south streets ran from Nine Mile Road to Woodward Heights Boulevard.

While largely retained, the grid has also been modified through the decades. Dead-end streets became increasingly common in the northeast area of the city after the construction of Karam Park and Longfellow Elementary school, which cut off the streets stemming from Vassar Avenue north of Woodward Heights Boulevard. Other dead-end streets occur at the borders of the properties for Webster Elementary, Ford Elementary, and Saint Justin's Catholic Church.

Economy 
The business districts developed along the city's main thoroughfares. Hazel Park's central business district (CBD) developed around the intersection of John R. Road and Nine Mile Road. This CBD contains the city's municipal buildings, two shopping centers, and a high-rise apartment complex. The first Harmony House music store opened in Hazel Park's Central Business District in 1947.

John R. Road serves as the main small business thoroughfare; the majority of the road is zoned for local business use. Small shopping centers, office parks, and sidewalk access stores are characteristic of the John R. corridor through the city. Nine Mile Road has a more suburban assortment of businesses, many of which are restaurants, churches, and slightly larger shopping centers. Eight Mile Road, Dequindre Road, and Ten Mile Road are also well-traveled, industry-related thoroughfares.

Government

Hazel Park has a Council-Manager form of government. It is governed by an elected City Council consisting of a Mayor and four council members.  The city council appoints a City Manager, who manages the day-to-day operations of the city.  The current mayor of Hazel Park is Michael Webb, who succeeded Jeffrey Keeton. Jan Parisi, the city's first woman mayor, resigned in 2016 due to health-and family-related reasons.

Current city council members are Alissa Sullivan, who also serves as Mayor Pro Tem, Andy LeCureaux, Luke Londo, and Mike McFall.  The current city manager is Edward Klobucher. City government is located on the same block as the public library, police station, and post office, at 9 Mile Road and John R. Road.

Crime
The crime rate in Hazel Park is low. The crime rate in the city in 2003 was 83.5% of the national average. In 2008, larceny theft made up 43.8% of the city's crime. In 2008 the violent crime rate declined by 57% from what it was in 2000. In contrast, the property crime rate rose 4.6% in the same time period. Specifically, the decrease has been in forcible rape and robbery crimes; and a slight increase in burglary and arson.

Hazel Park has the sixth-highest car theft rate in the state, and the 52nd-highest in the country. Vehicles built before 1992 are common targets, as are expensive vehicles, luxury SUVs, and minivans.

The Hazel Park Police Department has a force of 42 full-time police officers. The department has auxiliary policing and neighborhood watch programs available to citizens ages 21 and over. The police department offers programs such as gun lock giveaways, house watch programs, and programs to put a child up for adoption in case the parent is not capable of raising the child.

Geography
The city is bound by 10 Mile Road to the north, Dequindre Road to the east, 8 Mile Road to the south, and West End Street, Pilgrim Avenue, and Lenox Street to the west.

Demographics

The median income for a household in the city in 2008 was $40,403, and the median income for a family was $49,448. The per capita income for the city was $19,390. About 10.0% of families and 12.4% of the population were below the poverty line, including 17.0% of those under age 18 and 7.6% of those age 65 or over.

Excluding one neighborhood in particular, which has a majority elderly population, the city's median household income in 2009 was $46,687. This surpassed the neighboring communities of Warren, Madison Heights and Ferndale as well as many communities in the Detroit Metropolitan Area. Excluding the neighborhood noted, Hazel Park's median household income would be higher than 39.7% of the metro area, including 16.1% of Oakland County's cities, 61.5% of Macomb cities, and 55.8% of Wayne cities.

2010 census
As of the census of 2010, there were 16,422 people, 6,641 households, and 3,999 families residing in the city. The racial makeup of the city was 85.8% White, 6.8% African American, 0.9% Native American, 0.5% Asian, 0.4% from other races, and 4.6% from two or more races. Hispanic or Latino of any race were 2.7% of the population.

There were 6,641 households, of which 31.8% had children under the age of 18 living with them, 33.7% were married couples living together, 18.9% had a female householder with no husband present, 7.6% had a male householder with no wife present, and 39.8% were non-families. 32.2% of all households were made up of individuals, and 11.3% had someone living alone who was 65 years of age or older. The average household size was 2.47 and the average family size was 3.13.

The median age in the city was 36.1 years. 24.2% of residents were under the age of 18; 9.3% were between the ages of 18 and 24; 29.5% were from 25 to 44; 25.6% were from 45 to 64; and 11.3% were 65 years of age or older. The gender makeup of the city was 49.4% male and 50.6% female.

2000 census
In 2000, there were 7,284 households, out of which 33.4% had children under the age of 18 living with them, 41.6% were married couples living together, 16.1% had a female householder with no husband present, and 35.9% were non-families. 28.4% of all households were made up of individuals, and 11.1% had someone living alone who was 65 years of age or older.  The average household size was 2.60 and the average family size was 3.21.

In the city, the population was spread out, with 27.7% under the age of 18, 9.5% from 18 to 24, 33.2% from 25 to 44, 18.1% from 45 to 64, and 11.5% who were 65 years of age or older.  The median age was 33 years. For every 100 females, there were 97.3 males.  For every 100 females age 18 and over, there were 94.0 males.

73.1% of all households in Hazel Park were family households. 20.9% of all households were married couple families with children. 10.6% were single-mother families.

The census reported the city as 81.1% White, 9.7% African American, 0.90% Native American, 1.5% Asian, 0.90% from other races, and 4.20% from two or more races. Hispanic or Latino of any race were 2.7% of the population.

The top reported ancestries in the city were German (18.6%), Irish (14.8%), Polish (10.3%), English (9.7%), French (6.0%) and Italian (4.1%) Italian. French Canadians (3.6%), Scottish (3%), Arab (2.5%) and Dutch (1.6%).  The city has the second-largest proportion of Native American residents in Oakland County, after Keego Harbor.

In 2000, 7.2% of Hazel Park citizens were foreign born. 9.7% reported speaking a language other than English.

As of the 2000 Census, the median income for a household in the city was $37,045, and the median income for a family was $43,584. Males had a median income of $33,063 versus $24,362 for females. The per capita income for the city was $16,723.

Education

Primary and secondary schools
The city is served by the Hazel Park School District, which has some establishments in Ferndale, a neighboring city.
There are three elementary schools operating in the city of Hazel Park.

The northern portion of the city is served by Webb Elementary, while the southern portion is served by United Oaks Elementary and Hoover Elementary. Multiple other elementary schools once operated in the city, including Roosevelt, Lee O. Clark, Longfellow, Henry Ford, Webster, and Edison Elementaries. Webster was closed as an elementary school at the end of the 2014 school year, but remains open for the Preschool program. Lee O. Clark has since been demolished, and Henry Ford has been converted into the School District Administration Building. Henry Ford also serves as an alternative education facility for students K-8 called Advantage, and a program called Breakfast Club for high school students. 
There is one high school and one middle school operating in Hazel Park. Hazel Park has followed a recent trend in Metro Detroit suburbs by the consolidation of its middle schools. Formerly, two separate schools, Webb Junior High and Beecher Middle School, operated in the city. Webb was converted to an elementary school in 2004, and Beecher was torn down and re-built, commissioned as Hazel Park Junior High.

High schools in Hazel Park began with the construction of Lacey High School in 1920 and Hazel Park High School in 1929. Lacey High was demolished in the early 1960s, and the Hazel Park High School was re-commissioned as Howard Beecher Junior High. In 1961, a new high school was built in the eastern portion of the city, taking the name of Hazel Park High School.

Jardon Vocational School is also in operation in order to separate special needs students from the mainstream curriculum and serves as a high school. The school operates mainly in the Hazel Park-Ferndale-Pleasant Ridge area, but also serves the rest of Oakland County, especially the south east.

The high school had an average score of 10.3 on the state's MEAP test in 2011.  This was one of the lowest scores in Oakland County.

Notable people
 Connor Barwin, NFL defensive end; born in Southfield and grew up in Hazel Park
 Steve Fraser, 1984 Olympic wrestling gold medalist, coached at the University of Michigan
 James R. Fouts, current mayor of Warren, Michigan; father served as Hazel Park City Manager
 Myles Jury, UFC featherweight contender
 Archie McCardell, CEO of International Harvester 1977-82
 Shane Morris, quarterback for Warren De La Salle and the University of Michigan
 Joe Roa, MLB pitcher for Cleveland Indians and Minnesota Twins
 Jack Scott, Canadian-born singer who grew up in Hazel Park
 Terry Thomas, graduate of Hazel Park High School, drafted by the Detroit Pistons in 1975
 Bill Virdon, MLB outfielder and manager for several teams; 1955 National League Rookie of the Year and 1960 World Series champion; born in Hazel Park
 Bob Welch, pitcher for Los Angeles Dodgers and Oakland Athletics, NL and AL All-Star, 1990 AL Cy Young Award winner with the A's, pitching coach for Arizona Diamondbacks, 1974 graduate of Hazel Park High School
 Al Weston, All-State outfielder and 1973 graduate at HPHS, went on to play at MSU, earned All Big Ten and All American honors; drafted by the Seattle Mariners in 1977
 Robert Wyland, known for his mural paintings of whales and dolphins, attended Hoover Elementary School, which has a Wyland mural in its library

Hazel Park in popular culture
Scenes in the movie Youth in Revolt were filmed in and around Hazel Park.
Two novels, Band Fags! (2008) and Drama Queers! (2009), written by Hazel Park native Frank Anthony Polito, take place in Hazel Park during the 1980s.  Both books feature key scenes set at Hazel Park High School. Polito released his latest novel also set in Hazel Park during 2012 and 1994 called Lost in the '90s. The book was released in April 2012 from Polito's own imprint, Woodward Avenue Books.

Transportation
 provides a connection to neighboring cities such as Royal Oak and Detroit and other major cities in the United States
John R. Road provides access to Detroit, Madison Heights and the Oakland Mall
Dequindre Road provides access to Warren, Sterling Heights, Detroit and Universal Mall
 provides access to the former site of the Michigan State Fair, Detroit, Warren, Ferndale and other communities in Oakland, Macomb and Wayne counties.

References

External links

City of Hazel Park

Cities in Oakland County, Michigan
Metro Detroit
Populated places established in 1882
1882 establishments in Michigan